Clyde Leon (8 December 1983 – 28 April 2021) was a Trinidadian soccer player who played as a midfielder for Arima Fire and W Connection in his native Trinidad and Tobago, and for Itagüí Ditaires in Colombia. Leon scored 90 goals in 230 matches for W Connection. At international level, he made 48 appearances for the Trinidad and Tobago national team scoring once.

Death
Leon died aged 37 in April 2021.

References

External links
Caribbean Football Database
Soca Warriors
Trinidad Express

1983 births
2021 deaths
Sportspeople from Port of Spain
Trinidad and Tobago footballers
Association football midfielders
Trinidad and Tobago international footballers
TT Pro League players
W Connection F.C. players
Águilas Doradas Rionegro players
Trinidad and Tobago expatriate footballers
Trinidad and Tobago expatriate sportspeople in Colombia
Expatriate footballers in Colombia